Kim Gye-jong (born 27 July 1956) is a North Korean archer. He competed in the men's individual event at the 1980 Summer Olympics.

References

1956 births
Living people
North Korean male archers
Olympic archers of North Korea
Archers at the 1980 Summer Olympics
Place of birth missing (living people)